The Olympic Flight Museum is an aviation museum at the Olympia Airport in Olympia, Washington, USA. The museum has more than 10 vintage planes and helicopters on display, most of which are in airworthy condition. The museum also hosts the annual Olympic Air Show, featuring a selection of heritage and current military aircraft demonstrations.

History 
The museum was founded in 1998. In 2003, the museum started hosting an annual airshow called the "Gathering of Warbirds".

Aircraft on display

Fixed wing 

 Aero L-29 Delfín
 Aero L-39ZO Albatros
 Boeing-Stearman PT-17 Kaydet
 English Electric Lightning
 Goodyear FG-1D Corsair
 Mitsubishi A6M Zero (replica)
 North American P-51D Mustang

Helicopters 

 Bell AH-1 Cobra
 Bell HH-1K Iroquois
 Bell UH-1H Iroquois
 Hughes OH-6 Cayuse
 Kaman HH-43 Huskie

References

External links

Olympic Flight Museum

Aerospace museums in Washington (state)
Museums in Thurston County, Washington
Military and war museums in Washington (state)
Buildings and structures in Olympia, Washington
Tourist attractions in Olympia, Washington